Vladimir Stepania (born 8 May 1976) is a retired Georgian professional basketball player. He played at the center position.

Professional career
After starting to play basketball in his native country, Stepania played several years in Slovenia, namely with Olimpija Ljubljana, partnering with another center, Rasho Nesterović, in his first year.

Selected by the Seattle SuperSonics, late in the first round of the 1998 NBA Draft, Stepania became the first Georgian player to play in the NBA. For six seasons, in which he was a backup, he represented the Sonics, the New Jersey Nets, the Miami Heat, and the Portland Trail Blazers, averaging 4.1 points (with a total of 1,118 points scored) and 4.4 rebounds per game, in 270 regular season games. 

His best season was in 2002–03, with the Heat, in which he averaged 5.6 points and seven rebounds per game, battling for position in a club which had lost Alonzo Mourning for the year, with a kidney ailment; Stepania's career-high in points was 19, coming on 16 November 2001, against the Charlotte Hornets. On 19 November 2002, against the Milwaukee Bucks, he recorded a career-best 15 rebounds (on both occasions he represented the Heat).

In 2004, after a slow year with the Blazers, Stepania retired from playing professional basketball, at only 28.

National team career
Stepania was a member of the senior Georgian national basketball team.

NBA career statistics

Regular season

|-
| style="text-align:left;"|
| style="text-align:left;"|Seattle
| 23 || 6 || 13.6 || .424 || .000 || .525 || 3.3 || .5 || .4 || 1.0 || 5.5
|-
| style="text-align:left;"|
| style="text-align:left;"|Seattle
| 30 || 1 || 6.7 || .367 || .000 || .472 || 1.6 || .1 || .3 || .4 || 2.5
|-
| style="text-align:left;"|
| style="text-align:left;"|New Jersey
| 29 || 0 || 9.7 || .318 || .250 || .735 || 3.8 || .6 || .3 || .4 || 2.8
|-
| style="text-align:left;"|
| style="text-align:left;"|Miami
| 67 || 4 || 13.2 || .470 || .500 || .481 || 4.0 || .2 || .4 || .7 || 4.3
|-
| style="text-align:left;"|
| style="text-align:left;"|Miami
| 79 || 6 || 20.2 || .433 ||  || .530 || 7.0 || .3 || .6 || .5 || 5.6
|-
| style="text-align:left;"|
| style="text-align:left;"|Portland
| 42 || 2 || 10.8 || .417 ||  || .611 || 3.0 || .5 || .3 || .4 || 2.6
|- class="sortbottom"
| style="text-align:center;" colspan="2"|Career
| 270 || 19 || 13.8 || .425 || .133 || .536 || 4.4 || .3 || .4 || .5 || 4.1

References

External links

 FIBA bio
 FIBA Europe bio

1976 births
Living people
Centers (basketball)
Expatriate basketball people from Georgia (country) in the United States
KK Olimpija players
Miami Heat players
National Basketball Association players from Georgia (country)
New Jersey Nets players
Portland Trail Blazers players
Seattle SuperSonics draft picks
Seattle SuperSonics players